Santiago López Otero (born 16 June 1991) is a Uruguayan footballer who plays as a midfielder. He is currently a free agent.

Career
López's career began in 2009 with Central Español. He made his professional debut in the Uruguayan Primera División on 13 December 2009, featuring for the final thirty minutes as a second half substitute. He made four further appearances throughout 2009–10 for Central Español. López's next appearance came four seasons later, in a Uruguayan Segunda División defeat to Villa Teresa in May 2014. He played three more times in the following campaign of 2014–15, prior to departing the club midway through it in December.

Career statistics
.

References

External links

1991 births
Living people
Footballers from Montevideo
Uruguayan footballers
Association football midfielders
Uruguayan Primera División players
Uruguayan Segunda División players
Central Español players